Tó is a Portuguese nickname. People with this nickname include the following:
 Tó (Mozambican footballer) (born 1980), Mozambican footballer 
 Tó Barbosa, nickname for António João Ferradeira Santos (born 1992), Portuguese footballer
 Tó Cruz (born António José Ramos da Cruz, 1967), Portuguese singer
 Tó Ferreira, nickname for José António Alves Ferreira (born 1971), Portuguese footballer
 Zé Tó, nickname for José Ántónio Ramos Ribeiro (born 1977), Portuguese footballer

See also

To (disambiguation)
 Tó Neinilii, rain god of the Navajo
 To (surname), Chinese/Japanese surname
 Tô, Vietnamese surname
Tod (given name)
Toi (name)
Tom (given name)
Ton (given name)
Tor (given name)
Toy (given name)
Ty (given name)